Lisa Taraki (born 1948) is an Afghan-born Palestinian journalist, teacher and sociologist. She is an associate professor of sociology at Birzeit University in the West Bank and former Dean of its graduate students. She is the co-founder of the university's Institute of Women's Studies and founding Director of the doctoral program in social sciences. Taraki is also the co-founder of the Palestinian Campaign for the Academic and Cultural Boycott of Israel (PACBI), a campaign that spearheaded the BDS movement and advocates for academic and cultural boycotts of Israel until it stops what they see as violations of the Palestinians' human rights. She has also served as the director of the board of trustees for Al Haq.

Biography 
Taraki was born in Afghanistan to an American mother and Afghan father. After she had completed secondary school in Kabul, she traveled to the United States where she lived for close to ten years. She studied sociology at Mills College in California and continued her studies at the State University of New York at Buffalo (University at Buffalo) where she earned a Ph.D. in 1982. In her years in the U.S. she came in contact with the student-led anti-war movement against the Vietnam war and with Iranian students opposing the Shah's regime in Iran. During her doctoral studies, she met George Giacaman, a Palestinian student, whom she married. In 1976, they decided to move to Ramallah and she took up a position at Birzeit University. The language of instruction was English but as calls for Arabization increased more courses were given in Arabic and she had to learn the language.

In the early 1980s, student activism for Palestinian liberation began. Israel in response issued Military Order 854 in 1980, an adaptation of a Jordanian education law, which completely subjected higher education to military rule. Israel began exercising control over student admission, curricula, and employment on Palestinian universities. Additionally, international faculty were obliged to sign a document condemning PLO as a terrorist organization to obtain work permits from Israeli authorities. The solution Taraki and her colleagues come up with was to sign the document but to simply cut out article 18 - the part about PLO. In the end, the military order was frozen in 1982 due to the university's resistance and international solidarity campaigns. Many of Birzeit's students was arrested by the Israeli military and the university was closed several times. Taraki became an activist and got involved in the legal movement to get the students released from prison. When Birzeit was closed down, she and her colleagues would teach in churches, mosques, people's homes, or rented apartments. When the First intifada began in 1987, Birzeit was closed for four years.

In 1994, Taraki co-founded the Women's Studies program at Birzeit - the first of its kind in West Asia. In 2015, she helped launch the doctoral program in social studies at Birzeit, the first of its kind at a Palestinian university. Taraki has one child.

In 2002, Taraki got involved in the campaign to boycott Israel. It led to her co-founding PACBI in 2004 from which the Palestinian-led BDS movement emerged the following year. The movement calls for broad boycotts and divestment initiatives against Israel, similar to those applied to South Africa in the apartheid era, until Israel meets what the movement terms Israel's obligations under international law. She also serves on the advisory board of the US Campaign for the Academic and Cultural Boycott of Israel (USACBI).

Academic career
Taraki's research has focused on urban social history, the Palestinian national movement, gender in the Middle East, and on informal justice systems.

Taraki is the editor of Living Palestine: Family Survival, Resistance, and Mobility under Occupation published in 2006, a collection of research essays about the everyday lives of Palestinians living under occupation. The book is based on data from a survey of 2,000 Palestinian households in 19 communities in the West Bank and Gaza conducted in the summer of 1999. The book was favorably reviewed by Annelies Moors who wrote that "[t]hese contributions point to the insights one can gain from household surveys when gender-sensitive questions on labour, education, marriage, and so on are included." Maya Rosenfeld found the book a "timely addition to the disturbingly slender body of academic research on Palestinian society" during the current phase of Israeli military occupation.

Publications

Books

Chapters

Articles

References

Living people
Palestinian women sociologists
Palestinian sociologists
Palestinian people of American descent
Palestinian people of Afghan descent
Academic staff of Birzeit University
Afghan people of American descent
Afghan emigrants
Afghan expatriates in the United States
Immigrants to Palestine
Mills College alumni
University at Buffalo alumni
1948 births